Gamers: The Movie (or simply Gamers) is an independent 2006 mockumentary film written, directed and produced by Chris Folino. The film follows four friends who, saddled with "four of the worst jobs known to man", attempt to set the world record for playing Demons, Nymphs, and Dragons (DND), a Dungeons & Dragons-like game.

Filmed in only six days and entirely self-financed with $60,000 from credit cards, the film featured several 1980s stars in supporting roles: Kelly Le Brock (Weird Science), Beverly D'Angelo (Entourage, National Lampoon's Vacation), and William Katt (The Greatest American Hero).  The soundtrack also includes songs by Loverboy and other 1980s bands.

Indie film web sites Indie Film Nation and bumscorner.com named Gamers the "Best Film of 2006." It also received the award for Best Screenplay at the 2006 Melbourne Underground Film Festival.

References

External links
 
 Gamers Review "Best Movie of 2006", BumsCorner.com

2006 films
2006 comedy films
American mockumentary films
American independent films
2006 directorial debut films
2000s English-language films
2000s American films